Rafiat Folakemi Sule (born 3 August 2000), is a Nigerian professional footballer who plays as a forward at club level for the Bari-based A.S.D. Pink Sport Time, in Italian Serie A. She previously donned the colours of Rivers Angels, and was top scorer in the league for two consecutive seasons. She has been described as "technically sound" with a sharp eye for goals from all distance.

Club career 
In May 2015, Sule reiterated her full belief in the ability of her teammates and manager in the ongoing season. She opined that she was fully persuaded that Bayelsa Queens will end the season in a good position. During the 2015 season, Sule scored 11 goals in the league and two goals in the Federations Cup. She dedicated her golden boot to her deceased dad and teammates for the motivation, describing the award as something that came suddenly and as a sign that she is on the right path to fulfilling her dreams. Sule also deemed it as a collective indication of the efforts of her teammates. In 2016, her performance for Bayelsa Queens led to her nomination for the May 2016 player of the month. In March 2017, Sule alongside, Cecilia Nku, Halimatu Ayinde and Tochukwu Oluehi were signed by Rivers Angels.

At the 2017 Ladies in Sports conference, Sule was honoured for her outstanding performance during the previous season.

She joins the Italian Serie A A.S.D. Pink Sport Time team based in Bari in August 2020.

International career 
In February 2018, Sule was invited to the camp of the Nigerian national team ahead of the WAFU Cup in Côte d'Ivoire, but didn't make the final squad list.

Honours 
 2015 top scorer
 2016 top scorer
 Nigeria Pitch Awards - Most valuable player in 2016 Nigeria Women Premier League

References

External links
 

Nigerian women's footballers
Living people
Women's association footballers not categorized by position
2000 births
Bayelsa Queens F.C. players
Rivers Angels F.C. players
Sportspeople from Kaduna